Marston Montgomery is a small village and civil parish in western Derbyshire. The population of the civil parish as of the 2011 census was at least 3.  It is four miles from the town of Uttoxeter, Staffordshire. The Church of Saint Giles dates back to Norman times but was heavily restored during the 19th century. The village's school also has a lengthy history, as it has been in existence since at least 1831. Marston Montgomery is close to the villages of Cubley and Norbury.

See also
Listed buildings in Marston Montgomery

References

External links

Villages in Derbyshire
Derbyshire Dales